Emanuel "Manny" Guzmán (born July 7, 1986) is a Mexican-American footballer currently playing for Venados de Mérida in the Ascenso MX division.

Career

College and Amateur
Guzman grew up in Lakewood, California, and attended West High School in Torrance, California. He played one year of college soccer at Los Angeles Harbor College in 2005, scoring 10 goals and 11 assists, before transferring to California State University, Bakersfield in 2006.

During his college career and beyond, Guzman played with USL Premier Development League clubs Bakersfield Brigade, and Ventura County Fusion from 2009 through to 2010, and was part of the Fusion team which won the 2009 USL PDL national championship.

Professional
Guzman signed his first professional contract in March 2011, joining USL Pro club Wilmington Hammerheads. He made his professional debut on April 17, 2011, in Wilmington's first game of the 2011 season, a 1–0 win over the Rochester Rhinos.

References

External links
 CSU Bakersfield profile

1986 births
Living people
Footballers from Michoacán
Mexican footballers
American soccer players
Cal State Bakersfield Roadrunners men's soccer players
Bakersfield Brigade players
Ventura County Fusion players
Wilmington Hammerheads FC players
Charleston Battery players
USL League Two players
USL Championship players
People from Lakewood, California
Association football midfielders